The 1996–97 Liga Artzit season saw Hapoel Ashkelon win the title and earn promotion to the top division for the first time in their history. Ironi Ashdod were also promoted.

At the other end of the table, Hapoel Kiryat Shmona and Hapoel Hadera were relegated to Liga Alef.

Final table

References
Liga Artzit 1996/97 RSSSF
Liga Artzit IFA

Liga Artzit seasons
Israel
2